Murder at Yellowstone City (formerly titled Murder at Emigrant Gulch) is an American Western film directed by Richard Gray from a screenplay by Eric Belgau.

Premise
In a gold-rush boomtown that has gone bust, a prospector strikes gold - and is murdered. Sheriff Jim Ambrose (Gabriel Byrne) assumes the killer to be a newcomer, a former slave who calls himself Cicero (Isaiah Mustafa), because "he's the only man who doesn't know what I'll do to him." But as it becomes clear that Cicero is innocent, and as the mystery of the prospector's death deepens and puts the whole town in jeopardy, the town's new minister, Thaddeus Murphy (Thomas Jane) and his straight-shooting wife Alice (Anna Camp) must stand up to Sheriff Ambrose and bring the true culprit to justice.

Cast
 Isaiah Mustafa as Cicero
 Gabriel Byrne as Sheriff Jim Ambrose
 Thomas Jane as Thaddeus Murphy
 Richard Dreyfuss as Edgar Blake
 Nat Wolff as Jimmy Ambrose, Jr.
 Anna Camp as Alice Murphy
 Aimee Garcia as Isabel Santos
 Zach McGowan as Robert Dunnigan
 Scottie Thompson as Emma Dunnigan
 Emma Kenney as Rebecca Davies
 Tanaya Beatty as Violet Running Horse
 John Ales as Mickey O'Hare
 Lew Temple as David Harding
 Lia Marie Johnson as Eugenia Martin
 Isabella Ruby as Josephine Wright
 Danny Bohnen as Marcus O'Sullivan

Production
Principal photography began in May 2021, in Montana.  At the Cannes Film Market in June 2021, additional casting was revealed, and it was announced that production had wrapped.

Release
In April 2022, it was announced that RLJE Films acquired North American distribution rights to the film, which will be released in theaters and on VOD on June 24, 2022.

Reception
The film has a 25% rating on Rotten Tomatoes based on 20 reviews.

References

External links
 
 

2022 films
American Western (genre) films
Films set in Montana
Films shot in Montana
2020s English-language films
2020s American films